Faustine Lucie Merret (born 13 March 1978 in Brest) is a French windsurfer, who became Olympic champion at the 2004 Summer Olympics in the windsurfing class. She also has won several medals at World and European championships in the mistral and RS:X windsurfing classes.

Achievements

References

External links
 
 
 
 

1978 births
Living people
French windsurfers
Olympic sailors of France
French female sailors (sport)
Olympic gold medalists for France
Sailors at the 2004 Summer Olympics – Mistral One Design
Sailors at the 2008 Summer Olympics – RS:X
Olympic medalists in sailing
Medalists at the 2004 Summer Olympics
Sportspeople from Brest, France
21st-century French women
Female windsurfers